Arena Glacier is a glacier on Trinity Peninsula, the northernmost region of the Antarctic Peninsula. The Falkland Islands Dependencies Survey mapped the area in 1948 and again in 1955. Due to its flat ice floor on the upper half, they named it Arena Glacie, which was surrounded by the steep slopes of the Twin Peaks, Mount Taylor and Blade Ridge, resembling an arena.

See also
 Glaciology
 List of glaciers in the Antarctic

References 

Glaciers of Trinity Peninsula